Andaw Thein ( amtau sim bhu.ra:,  Añṯotheiñ hpăyà) is a Buddhist temple in Mrauk U located at the northwest corner of the Shite-thaung Temple. The name means 'Tooth Shrine'. It contains a tooth relic of the Buddha brought over from Sri Lanka. It was first built as an ordination hall between 1515 and 1521 by King Thazata, and restored by Min Bin between 1534 and 1542. It was later expanded into a temple by King Raza II in order to house a tooth relic of the Buddha he brought back from his pilgrimage to Ceylon, either in 1596 or 1606–1607.

Notes

References

Bibliography
 
 

Buddhist temples in Rakhine State
Pagodas in Myanmar
17th-century Buddhist temples
1521 establishments in Asia
16th-century establishments in the Mrauk-U Kingdom
Religious buildings and structures completed in 1607